Agnes Geene (born 1947, married name Agnes van der Meulen) is a Dutch badminton player.

Career
Agnes Geene won the junior championships in the Netherlands in 1964. In the following year, she succeeded as a senior for the first time. She was able to win both the ladies' double and the ladies' single championships. Six more titles followed until 1974. She won bronze at the 1968 European Badminton Championships in the Women's doubles.

Results

References

External links
badmintoneurope.com

Dutch female badminton players
1947 births
Living people